Gürsoy is a Turkish surname. It may refer to:

Bedri Gürsoy (1902–1994), Turkish football player
Dilek Gürsoy (born 1976), German female heart surgeon of Turkish descent
Gürhan Gürsoy (born 1987), Turkish professional footballer
Güven Gürsoy (born 1992), Turkish professional footballer
Hüseyin Gürsoy (born 1932), Turkish wrestler
Yaprak Gürsoy (born 1978), Turkish female political scientist and associate professor

Turkish-language surnames